The Mistress of the Copper Mountain, also known as The Malachite Maid, is a legendary creature from Slavic mythology and a Russian fairy tale character, the mountain spirit from the legends of the Ural miners and the Mistress of the Ural Mountains of Russia. In the national folktales and legends, she is depicted as an extremely beautiful green-eyed young woman in a malachite gown or as a lizard with a crown. She has been viewed as the patroness of miners, the protector and owner of hidden underground riches, the one who can either permit or prevent the mining of stones and metals in certain places.

"The Copper Mountain" is the Gumyoshevsky mine, the oldest mine of the Ural Mountains, which was called "The Copper Mountain" or simply "The Mountain" by the populace. It is now located in the town of Polevskoy, Sverdlovsk Oblast. In some regions of the Ural Mountains, the image of the Mistress is connected with another female creature from the local folktales, the Azov Girl, the enchanted girl or princess who lives inside Mount Azov.

The Mistress of the Copper Mountain became a well known character from her appearance in Pavel Bazhov's collection of the Ural Mountains folktales (also known as skaz) called The Malachite Box. The Mistress appears in the third skaz, "The Mistress of the Copper Mountain", and in 9 other stories from the collection, including "The Stone Flower", "The Manager's Boot-Soles", and "Sochen and His Stones".

Characteristics
The Mistress of the Copper Mountain has the appearance of an extremely beautiful young woman with green eyes. Some of her more distinctive features include dark braided hair, ribbons from thin tinkling copper, and a gown that is made from malachite. She wears a diadem decorated with malachite and precious stones. As a mountain spirit, she is the protector and owner of hidden underground riches. She is said to be always surrounded by her servants, small lizards, which can be green, blue, golden or luminous. The Mistress can appear as a lizard herself. According to the legends, a person who sees the Mistress comes under her spell. She shows kindness to good people and skilled craftsmen, helping them to find jewels and gold, but if her conditions aren't met, the person loses all his luck, skill and can even die. She could permit or prevent the mining in certain places, give or take wealth.

The sacral being, the Mistress was surrounded by rituals and taboos, e.g. women did not come down in the mine, because it was the Mistress's domain, and young men seeking her patronage did not marry. The violation of the taboos was supposed to bring a harsh punishment. Children were taught not to shout and quarrel next to the stones, and to keep quiet in the mines, because, according to popular belief, the Maid disliked loud noises. Her distinguishing attributes were lizards, copper and malachite.

Other names 
The Mistress of the Copper Mountain has many other names, such as The Stone Mother, The Stone Maiden, The Serpent Mistress, The Lizard Queen, The Mistress of the Copper Mine, The Malachite Girl, The Malachite Maid or The Malachite Lady. The miners simply called her "Herself".

The Azov Girl
In many national folktales, the Mistress and Azovka (lit. "the Azov Girl") are identical with each other, and the same stories are told about each of them. The tales about Azovka are very different from one another, although they share some common characteristics. Firstly, that there's a cave with hidden treasures inside Mount Azov. Secondly, few people found the cave, and no one could get the treasures. The treasures belong to the Tatars, the Bashkirs, or "the Old People". According to popular belief, Azovka lives/is held captive inside the cave (or the mountain), and she guards the treasures. In most tales, she is the enchanted girl, possibly stolen by the Tatars, the cursed Tatar princess, the Old People's queen or their elder's daughter.

Appearances

In The Malachite Box 
The Mistress of the Copper Mountain appears in the third Pavel Bazhov's skaz from The Malachite Box, "The Mistress of the Copper Mountain", first published in the 11th issue of Krasnaya Nov in 1936; and then in many other tales: "The Malachite Casket", "The Stone Flower", "The Manager's Boot-Soles", "Sochen and His Stones", "The Master Craftsman", "The Two Lizards", "A Fragile Twig", "The Grass Hideaway", and "Tayutka's Mirror". Bazhov confirmed that he based the character on local legends. He said: "Yes, I believe that the series of tales connected with the Gumyoshevsky mine is closer to folklore. In my opinion, they represent the attempt to reconstruct the folklore of this mine". When asked whether the character from his writing differs from its folklore interpretation, Bazhov replied: "I don't believe there is a difference. If there is, it is bad [news]".

In "The Mistress of the Copper Mountain" she is described as follows:
You could see from her plait she was a maid. It was a sort of deep black, that plait of hers, and didn't dangle as our maids' do, but lay close and straight down her back. And the ribbons at the end weren't quite red and weren't quite green, they'd something of both. You could see the light shining through them and they seemed to click a little, like thin leaves of copper. [...] She was not very tall, with a pretty figure, and she was a real fidget - couldn't sit still a minute. [...] Her robe, now, it was something you'd never see anywhere else. It was all made of silk malachite, that's a kind you get sometimes. It's stone but it looks like silk, you want to take and stroke it. 

In "The Stone Flower" it's said that the Mistress has her own "mountain craftsmen":
They're skilful craftsmen who live in the mountain, and no man ever sees them. Whatever the Mistress wants, they  make it for her. I saw a bit of their work once. [...] Our serpents, no matter how good they are, they're but stone, but this was like as if it was living. A black line down the black, and eyes—ye'd think it was just going to up and sting ye. They can make anything!

In "The Manager's Boot-Soles" it's said that the Mistress "didn't like it when folks were treated ill underground". She appears before the cruel bailiff:
All of a sudden the bailiff saw a figure in front of him. It was moving lightly, waving a lamp. At the turn of the gallery he saw it was a woman. [...] He started running after her, but his faithful men weren't in any great hurry to follow. They were all shaking.  Because they saw this was bad — it was she herself. [...] The bailiff saw a maid of amazing beauty standing before him, and here brows were drawn together in a line and her eyes blazed like burning coals.

In The Malachite Box, she serves as a "magic helper" to the characters. "It's a chancy thing to meet her, it brings woe for a bad man". She can be reached through the stone forest. She is cruel and just, she dislikes greedy people and is indifferent toward their suffering, but she shows her benevolent side to those with talent and selflessness. Valentin Blazhes stated that in the Malachite Box she is a classical ambivalent character, because she combines good and evil, life and death, beauty and ugliness. Nataliya Shvabauer commented that her duality is represented in her every trait, from the appearance to her functions. Even her jokes can be deadly, as evident from "Sochen and His Stones".

In other media
The character Queen of the Copper Mountain appeared in Mercedes Lackey's 2007 novel Fortune's Fool. She also appears as the title character in Mercedes Lackey’s 2020 novel Jolene which is set in the coal mines of rural Tennessee.

Shimun Vrochek authored a story called The Master of the Copper Mountain, in which he mentioned the character. It was published in his Serzhantu Nikto Ne Zvonit collection in 2006.

Vladimir Makanin wrote the Mistress parody characters in some of his stories, such as the mother of the character Kolka in his 1976 short story "Voices".

Origin and development 

Pavel Bazhov had heard the tales about her at the Polevskoy Copper Smelting Plant from the miners' storyteller Vasily Hmelinin, nicknamed "Grandpa Slyshko" by children. "The Copper Mountain" is believed to be the Gumyoshevsky mine, the oldest mine of the Ural Mountains. It was sometimes called "The Copper Mountain" or simply "The Mountain" by the populace. Valery Dyomin commented that the Mistress is a universal mytheme, while the Copper mountain is the specific location: the Gumyoshevsky mine and Mount Azov.

The origin of the character is unclear. A concept of a mother goddess or Mother Earth was very popular in every culture, including the local Mansi and Khanty people. The Ural ethnographer A. Sagalayev suggested that the character originated from the goddesses Umay and Kaltes-Ekwa. He noted that the figure of a mother goddess in people's perception sometimes shrinks to the size of a rock and a sculpture or expands to the size of a mountain. The Mistress might have appeared as a successor of Azovka, because she was most famous in the same areas as Azovka before her, so the keeper of treasures slowly turned into their master. Bazhov believed that the most ancient creature of the Ural mythology was in fact Azovka, the Great Serpent appeared next, and the last one was the Mistress. Just like Azovka, the Malachite Maid attracts single men. Mark Lipovetsky commented her black hair colour hints at her non-Slavic parentage, possibly from the "Old People", like Azovka. Dark-haired and mysterious, she does not look like typical Russian girls. Bazhov believed that miners simply missed women, because their work allowed for little contact with them. He also thought that the Mistress outgrew her initial function of a treasure keeper. She became "the embodiment of power, wealth and beauty" which revealed itself only before the best of people. E. Kulikova theorized that her place in the Ural mythology is most likely connected with the perception of the mountains as "magical space". The mountain was the source of life, the protector from hostile forces and the residence of divine patrons.

Alexei Ivanov suggested that the Mistress most likely originates from a spirit of place as a "stone dryad". There is also a hypothesis that she repsesents the Roman goddess Venus, as local copper from the Polevskoy Copper Smelting Plant was branded with the Venus symbol (♀) for tens of years in the 18th century. V. Bezrukova theorizes that the Mistress of the Copper Mountain symbolizes the "relationship" between people and the mountain riches, and that she in fact protects Christian virtues, e.g. she prevents greed, encourages kindness, modesty, honor and skill (Christian virtues). However Alexei Ivanov argues that she reveals her "genetic relationship" with pagan gods, and her ethics is not Christian. In one of the stories she takes the gold out of the mine after a church is built nearby.

Maya Nikulina points at her relation to the realm of the dead, as she does not ear or drink, does not leave any traces, her clothing is made of stone and so on, and the Mountain connects her to the world of the living. The character might be of Finnic origin. The Finnic peoples, who lived in that area, later migrated to the Baltic Sea or assimilated into the new Russian culture. Their folklore featured the underground riches, moral and spiritual powers, impersonated in Chthonic deities, mining and metallurgic techniques unknown to Russians.

The Mistress's attributes—lizards, copper and malachite—are not Christian. Nataliya Shvabauer commented that the lizards are foul supernatural creatures. The images of lizards and snakes were found on the Permian bronze casts (the 5-15 centuries) around Mount Azov. Copper was a symbol of female beauty at the Urals. Malachite symbolized youth, hope, misfortune and grief at the same time. The craftsmen who worked with malachite often died of tuberculosis, affected by the poisonous malachite dust. The gemcutters produced malachite jewellery for sale only, but never wore it themselves. Keeping it in the house was a bad omen.

Reception 
The Mistress became a popular character in the Soviet Union. The folklorists of the Ural State University, who collected tales near Sysert after Pavel Bazhov's death, noted they "have not met a single person who did not hear about the Mistress", but they mostly knew about her from Bazhov's skazy and referred to them: "Read some Bazhov, he wrote it down". Few story-tellers heard of her from oral tradition.

During Soviet times critics commonly described this character as the protector of the working class from the oppressors. Maya Nikulina argued that the Mistress is neither the rescuer nor the protector. Rather than defending the workers, she tests them. Social justice is of no concern to her: "the landlord is punished for being greedy and stupid", not for being the landlord. Mark Lipovetsky commented that she is the most terrifying characters of the collection, a beautiful girl and a dangerous demonic creature at the same time. He believed that she represents the struggle and unity between Eros and Thanatos, and that she is characterized by three major Freudian motives—the sexual drive, the death drive (her realm is the realm of the dead) and the castration anxiety (loss of power). The latter is shown when she persistently and spitefully provokes the local administration, forcing the protagonists ("The Mistress of the Copper Mountain", "The Two Lizards") to relay offensive messages. Denis Zherdev pointed out that the Mistress's female domain is the world of chaos, destruction or spontaneous uncontrolled acts of creation. Colliding with the ordered factory world, such power brings in randomness, variability, unpredictability and capriciousness. Direct contact with it is a violation of world order, and does not end well. The author of The Fairy Tale Encyclopedia suggests that the Mistress represents the conflict between human kind and nature. She compares the character with Mephistopheles, because a human needs to wager his soul with her in order to get the ultimate knowledge, however, the Mistress does not force anyone to abandon their moral values, and therefore "is not painted in dark colours". Lyudmila Skorino believed that she represented the nature of the Urals, which inspires a creative person with its beauty.

See also 
 Karzełek
 Shubin (ghost)
 The Fire-Fairy

References

Sources 
 
 
 
 
 
 
 
 
 

Slavic tutelary deities
Russian folklore characters
Mythic humanoids
Fictional lizards
Female legendary creatures
Mining folklore
Fictional characters with earth or stone abilities
Russian mythology
Female characters in fairy tales
Legendary serpents
Mythological queens
Slavic legendary creatures
Slavic folklore characters